Ricchiuti is an Italian surname. Notable people with the surname include:

Adrián Ricchiuti (born 1978), Argentine-Italian footballer and coach
Giovanni Ricchiuti (born 1948), Italian bishop
Peter Ricchiuti (born 1957), American academic

Italian-language surnames